Hey Jude/Hey Bing! is a long-playing vinyl album recorded by Bing Crosby for Amos Records at United Recorders Studio, Hollywood. The orchestra and chorus were conducted by Jimmy Bowen who also produced the album. Glen Hardin arranged tracks 4 and 6–10, Jimmie Haskell arranged tracks 2, 3 and 5 while Mike Post arranged track 1.

The album has never been issued on CD.

Reception
The British publication Gramophone commented: "Bing Crosby has lost none of his mellow warmth of voice in Hey Jude, Hey Bing! (London SHU8391) as he gives us his versions of the Beatle ballad, “Little Green Apples,” “Both Sides Now,” and “Those Were The Days,” thereby adding to the potency of the songs themselves."

Track listing
Side one

Side two

References

External links
 BING magazine
 BingCrosby.com
 Bing Crosby on Facebook
 Crosby Fan World

1969 albums
Bing Crosby albums
albums produced by Jimmy Bowen
albums arranged by Jimmie Haskell